The Open Door EP is an extended play by band Death Cab for Cutie, comprising songs recorded during the Narrow Stairs sessions and a demo version of the track "Talking Bird" from the album.

Regarding the release, Ben Gibbard states: Were all written with the songs from Narrow Stairs during, I guess, what would be the end of 2006 into 2007, as we were moving towards recording the album. All these songs, with the exception of "Little Bribes," were recorded during the sessions for Narrow Stairs.

The album was nominated for Best Alternative Music Album at the 52nd Grammy Awards.

Track listing
All songs written by Ben Gibbard except where noted.

Release history
The EP was initially released digitally on March 31, 2009, followed by a physical CD release on April 7, 2009 at live performances and a retail release on April 14, 2009. It has peaked at #30 on the Billboard 200.

References

External links
 

2009 EPs
Death Cab for Cutie albums
Albums produced by Chris Walla